Mathias Bossaerts (born 10 July 1996) is a Belgian former professional footballer. He played as a center back.

Career 
Bossaerts was a regular player of the Belgian international youth teams. He joined K.V. Oostende in 2016 from Manchester City, and made his Belgian Pro League debut on 27 August 2016 against Waasland-Beveren. 

In 2022, he decided to end his professional football career at the age of 25.

References

External links
 

1996 births
Living people
Association football central defenders
Belgian footballers
Belgian expatriate footballers
K.V. Oostende players
NEC Nijmegen players
Belgian Pro League players
Eerste Divisie players
Belgium youth international footballers
Belgian expatriate sportspeople in the Netherlands
Expatriate footballers in the Netherlands
People from Brasschaat
Footballers from Antwerp Province